Davelis Cave is a well-known cave in Penteli, a mountain to the north of Athens, Greece.

Discovery
Davelis Cave was brought to light circa the 5th century BC. The surrounding area was used as a marble quarry by the builders of the Acropolis, and the cave was discovered by chance, during works for the extraction of marble.

Name
The cave's name comes from the wide belief that an infamous 19th century brigand called Davelis (real name Christos Natsios) used the cave as a hideout. The story says that Davelis hid his treasure inside the cave.

The official name of the cave is simply "Cave of Pendeli".

Religious uses
In Antiquity, the cave was a place of worship for the followers of Pan and the nymphs. There is a much smaller cave a few hundred meters up the mountain called Nymphaion or Nymph shrine.

During the Middle Ages, it was used by Orthodox Christian hermits, and later a small church was built at the entrance of the cave, featuring an unusual double layout: one part devoted to Saint Spyridon and one to Saint Nicholas. This unusual layout has led to the construction of the church being associated with Gnostics.

The cave is also believed to have been (and possibly still is) used by other religious groups, mainly occultists.

Military uses

Many times during its history, the cave has been used as a shelter for civilians.

In 1977, construction works started at the cave. It was not clear who was behind it. It might have been top U.S. governmental pressures to the Greek government. The exact nature or target of those works never became known, and the works ceased a few years later, in 1983.

A widely publicised rumour claims that the aim of the works was to create a nuclear weapon storage facility in the cave. However, the few completed parts of the works (that are deserted and easily accessible to the public, today) make this claim seem very unrealistic.

More realistic scenarios suggest that the site would be a radar base or a communication base (similar bases of the Greek Army and the US Army exist in other parts of the mountain).

One thing is for sure: Experiments took place in the cave or in the artificial tunnels around it.

Paranormal activity
The cave has been associated with paranormal activity since the ancient times, this being the main reason behind its use as a place of worship.

The mystical character of the cave continues to fascinate people even today, and dozens of urban legends connected to the cave exist.

References

Caves of Greece
Landforms of North Athens (regional unit)
Reportedly haunted locations in Greece